Cane Creek Falls is an  plunge waterfall located along Cane Creek near Spencer, Tennessee, above the creek's confluence with Rockhouse Creek and Fall Creek. The waterfall is visible from the Gorge Trail and from the base of the Cane Creek Gorge, which can be accessed via the Cable Trail. The falls are located in Fall Creek Falls State Park.

References

Waterfalls of Tennessee
Waterfalls of Van Buren County, Tennessee